F. L. Věk was a Czechoslovak television programme which was first broadcast in 1971, based on Alois Jirásek's book of the same name. The programme was directed by František Filip.

References

External links 
 CSFD.cz - F. L. Věk (TV seriál)
 

Czechoslovak television series
1971 Czechoslovak television series debuts
Czech drama television series
1970s Czechoslovak television series
1972 Czechoslovak television series endings
Czech historical television series
Czechoslovak Television original programming